Angel of the West is an outdoor sculpture in Jupiter, Florida, United States. The sculpture was made in 2008 by German sculptor Julian Voss-Andreae. Referencing British sculptor Antony Gormley's monumental 1998 piece Angel of the North it was created based on an antibody structure published by E. Padlan for the Florida campus of the Scripps Research Institute. The antibody is placed into a ring referencing Leonardo da Vinci's Vitruvian Man highlighting the similar proportions of the antibody and the human body.

See also 
 Angel of the North
 White Horse at Ebbsfleet, sometimes called "The Angel of The South".

References

External links
Oregon Art Beat: Quantum Sculptures with Julian Voss-Andreae Oregon Public Broadcasting TV piece about the creation of Angel of the West (December 2008)
Protein Data Bank newsletter Interview: Julian Voss-Andreae, Protein Sculptor (pp. 9–11, January 2007)

2008 sculptures
Buildings and structures in Palm Beach County, Florida
Jupiter, Florida
Outdoor sculptures in Florida
Scripps Research
Stainless steel sculptures in the United States
Steel sculptures in Florida